Lubcza may refer to the following places:
Lubcza, Kuyavian-Pomeranian Voivodeship (north-central Poland)
Lubcza, Lesser Poland Voivodeship (south Poland)
Lubcza, Świętokrzyskie Voivodeship (south-central Poland)
Lubcza, today's spelling Lubcha, a town in Belarus, in Grodno Region